The Dominican Summer Dodgers are a minor league baseball team in the Dominican Summer League. The team plays in the Boca Chica Northwest division and is affiliated with the Los Angeles Dodgers.

They have operated since 1989. Occasionally the Dodgers have fielded two teams in the DSL. In 1990, they had the DSL Cibao Dodgers and the DSL San Pedro de Macoris Dodgers and from 1992–2004 they had the DSL Dodgers 1 and DSL Dodgers 2.

Roster

External links
DSL Dodgers Bautista
DSL Dodgers Shoemaker

Baseball teams established in 1989
Los Angeles Dodgers minor league affiliates
Dominican Summer League teams
1989 establishments in the Dominican Republic